The men's and women's field hockey competitions at the 2014 South American Games were the second inclusion of hockey at the South American Games. Both tournaments were held in conjunction with one another between 8 and 16 March 2014 at Club Deportivo Manquehue in Santiago, Chile.

In the men's tournament, Argentina won the gold medal for the second time by defeating Chile 8–1 in the final. Venezuela won the bronze medal by defeating Brazil 3–2 in the bronze-medal match.

In the women's tournament, Argentina won the gold medal for the second time by defeating Chile 3–1 in the final. Uruguay won the bronze medal by defeating Brazil 3–0 in the bronze-medal match.

The top two teams in the men's tournament, Argentina and Chile, and the top two teams in the women's tournament, Argentina and Chile all qualified to compete at the 2015 Pan American Games in Toronto, Ontario, Canada.

Participating nations

Men's tournament

Women's tournament

Medal summary

Medal table

Men's tournament

Round robin

Classification round

Fifth and sixth place

Bronze-medal match

Gold-medal match

Final standings

 Qualified for the 2015 Pan American Games

Goalscorers

Women's tournament

The competition consisted of two stages; a preliminary round followed by a classification round.

Participating nations

Preliminary round

Classification matches

Bronze-medal match

Gold-medal match

Final standings

References

2014 South American Games events
South American Games
2014
2014 South American Games
Qualification tournaments for the 2015 Pan American Games